W. Elliott Walden (born February 10, 1963, in Lexington, Kentucky) is the President and CEO of racing operations for WinStar Farm near Versailles, Kentucky and a former Thoroughbred racehorse trainer.

Early life

From a racing family, Walden grew up in the industry. As a kid, Walden cleaned stalls, washed horses and was riding horses since he was young. Walden's father attached a basketball hoop on top of one of the stalls which racehorse No Robbery was in, and Elliott would play basketball there with his brother Ben Jr.

Career

He worked as an assistant for high-profile trainers such as LeRoy Jolley and John Gosden before taking out his trainers' license in 1985 and trained four horses for his father, Ben P. Walden, Sr. 

In 1998, Elliott Walden conditioned Victory Gallop to a win in the Belmont Stakes, the third leg of the U.S. Triple Crown series.
The following year Victory Gallop gave Walden his first Champion when he was voted the 1999 American Champion Older Male Horse. In 2001, Walden trained License Fee to victory in the Just a Game Stakes.

In 2002 Walden took over training of the Winstar Farm racing stable and in 2003 was appointed vice president of racing and bloodstock services. Since 2010, Walden has served as the CEO of Winstar Farms.

Personal life

Walden's wife Rebecca is a native of England. Walden and his wife Rebecca have four children together. Elliott Walden is a born again Christian.

References

1963 births
Living people
American horse trainers
Businesspeople from Lexington, Kentucky